Rockpalast: Cold Chisel was a live-to-air television screening of a rock concert performance at Hamburg, Germany's Markthalle on 3 December 1982 by Australian pub-rock band Cold Chisel. It was filmed as an episode of WDR's long-standing live concert television show Rockpalast.

A DVD of the live concert screening entitled Cold Chisel: Rockpalast was released on 26 May 2007 by Warner in Australia.

Track listing
Merry Go Round
Khe Sanh
Wild Colonial Boy
Taipan
Bow River
One Long Day
You Got Nothing I Want
My Turn to Cry
Forever Now
Letter to Alan
Houndog
Four Walls
Standing on the Outside
Don't Let Go
Star Hotel
Goodbye (Astrid Goodbye)
Cheap Wine1st encore
Wild Thing
The Party's Over
Rising Sun
Conversations2nd encore
When Something Is Wrong with My Baby
Breakfast at Sweethearts
I'm Gonna Roll Ya

2007 films
Australian musical films
Concert films
Films shot in Hamburg
Cold Chisel
2000s Australian films